Ruventhiran a/l Vengadesan (born 24 August 2001) is a Malaysian professional footballer who plays as a full-back for Malaysia Super League side Selangor and the Malaysia national team.

Club career

Early career

Born in Klang, Selangor, Ruventhiran began playing football at the age of 5 at a small academy. He then moved to CIMB-MBSA, CIMB-YFA, and finally he went to Bayern Munich to represent CIMB by participating in Alliance League. Ruventhiran continued his journey by joining MISC-MIFA for a year and later played for Belia Selangor before joining the Petaling Jaya City under-19 and progressing to the under-21.

Petaling Jaya City

In the end of 2020, he signed his first professional contract with the club. Ruventhiran was assigned the number 19 shirt and simultaneously made his professional and club debut on 7 March 2021 in a league match against Perak. He scored his first goal for the club in a 1–1 draw against Penang on 18 April 2021. 

On two years alongside with the main team, he made 41 appearances and recorded two goals and three assists.

Selangor

On 18 December 2022, Ruventhiran rejoin his former club Selangor, following departure of PJ City from a part in professional football.

International career

Senior 

On 20 May 2022, Ruventhiran was called up to join the Malaysia national team for the first time, ahead of two friendly matches against Brunei on 27 May 2022 and Hong Kong on 1 June 2022. He made his international debut for the senior team against Brunei, where he was substituted in the 62th minute of a 4–0 win. 

He was a part of the squad to represent for 2023 AFC Asian Cup qualifying matches, which helping guide senior team to the final tournament. On 23 November 2022, he was named in Malaysia's preliminary 41-man squad for the 2022 AFF Championship, being included in the final 23-man squad for the tournament.

He is the one of few players to play AFF tournament two times in a year.

Career statistics

Club

International

References

External links
 

Living people
Malaysian footballers
Malaysian sportspeople of Indian descent
Malaysian people of Tamil descent
Association football midfielders
Malaysia Super League players
Petaling Jaya City FC players
2001 births
People from Selangor